The 2022 Utah State Aggies football team represented Utah State University as a member of the Mountain Division of the Mountain West Conference during the 2022 NCAA Division I FBS football season. The Aggies were led by second-year head coach Blake Anderson and played their home games at Maverik Stadium in Logan, Utah.

The team was led on offense by quarterback Logan Bonner. Bonner opened the season with 281 passing yards and three passing touchdowns against UConn.

Previous season
The Aggies finished the 2021 season 11–3, 6–2 in Mountain West play to win the Mountain division. As a result, they earned a bid in the Mountain West  Championship game. They defeated San Diego State in the championship game to win the Mountain West championship. They received an invitation to the LA Bowl where they defeated Oregon State.

Schedule

Game summaries

vs. UConn Huskies

at No. 1 Alabama Crimson Tide

Sources:

References

Utah State
Utah State Aggies football seasons
Utah State Aggies football